Finally is a collaboration album between midwest rappers Layzie Bone of Bone Thugs-n-Harmony and A.K. of Do or Die. The album also features cuts from Bone Thugs-n-Harmony's 2007 album Strength & Loyalty. Some of those cuts includes an added on verse by Bone Thugs member Bizzy Bone.

Track listing

2008 albums
Layzie Bone albums
Collaborative albums